Wilfried Ebane Abessolo (born 26 April 1992) is a Gabonese professional footballer who plays as a defender for Championnat National 2 club Vannes.

Club career
Ebane began his footballing career with Akanda FC in Gabon, and moved to the lower divisions of France before transferring to FC Lorient on 2018. Ebane made his professional debut with Lorient in a 1–0 Coupe de la Ligue win over Valenciennes FC on 14 August 2018. In August 2019 he was loaned to USL Dunkerque until the end of the 2019–20 season.

International career
Ebane represented the Gabon national team for 2016 African Nations Championship qualification.

References

External links
 
 

1992 births
Living people
Sportspeople from Libreville
Gabonese footballers
Gabon international footballers
Association football defenders
Ligue 2 players
Championnat National players
Saint-Colomban Sportive Locminé players
FC Lorient players
USL Dunkerque players
Vannes OC players
Gabonese expatriate footballers
Gabonese expatriate sportspeople in France
Expatriate footballers in France
21st-century Gabonese people